Qaleh Kharabeh (also Romanized as Qal‘eh Kharābeh; also known as Eslāmābād (Persian: اسلام آباد), Kharābeh Shahr, and Qal‘eh) is a village in Kohanabad Rural District, Kohanabad District, Aradan County, Semnan Province, Iran. At the 2006 census, its population was 65, in 21 families.

References 

Populated places in Aradan County